Fictionalism is the view in philosophy according to which statements that appear to be descriptions of the world should not be construed as such, but should instead be understood as cases of "make believe", of pretending to treat something as literally true (a "useful fiction").

Concept 
Fictionalism consists in at least the following three theses:
 Claims made within the domain of discourse are taken to be truth-apt; that is, true or false
 The domain of discourse is to be interpreted at face value—not reduced to meaning something else 
 The aim of discourse in any given domain is not truth, but some other virtue(s) (e.g., simplicity, explanatory scope).

Two important strands of fictionalism are modal fictionalism developed by Gideon Rosen, which states that possible worlds, regardless of whether they exist or not, may be a part of a useful discourse, and mathematical fictionalism advocated by Hartry Field.

Modal fictionalism is recognized as further refinement to the basic fictionalism as it holds that representations of possible worlds in texts are useful fictions. A conceptualization explains that it is a descriptive theorizing of what a text such as the Bible in fact amounts to. It is associated with linguistic ersatzism in the sense that both are views possible worlds.

Fictionalism, on the other hand, in the philosophy of mathematics states that talk of numbers and other mathematical objects is nothing more than a convenience for doing science. According to Field, there is no reason to treat parts of mathematics that involve reference to or quantification as true. In this discourse, mathematical objects are accorded the same metaphysical status as literary figures such as Macbeth.

Also in meta-ethics, there is an equivalent position called moral fictionalism (championed by Richard Joyce). Many modern versions of fictionalism are influenced by the work of Kendall Walton in aesthetics.

See also 
 Color fictionalism
 Hans Vaihinger
 Philosophy of color
 Quietism (philosophy)

Further reading

References

External links 
 
 
 
 

Philosophical methodology
Theories of deduction